Whispering Hope may refer to;

"Whispering Hope" (song), a song written in 1868 by Septimus Winner
Whispering Hope (album), a 1962 album by Jo Stafford and Gordon MacRae